Bikapur is a town, tehsil and nagar panchayat of Faizabad district (officially Ayodhya district) of Uttar Pradesh state in India. Bikapur is 25 km south of the district headquarters Ayodhya city.

Demographics
In 2011 total population of Bikapur 14,453.

Governance and politics

Civic administration
Bikapur is also a block in Faizabad district in Uttar Pradesh. There is a police station in Bikapur.

Places of interest
There are many nearest tourist attraction places like as Sitakund (2 km) which is 84 kosi parikarma site, Bharatkund (6 km) Bharat Hanuman Milaap sthal and Ayodhya (25 km) Birthplace of Lord Rama.

Transport

By Air
Ayodhya Airport  (under construction)(20 km) is  the nearest international airport to Bikapur. Allahabad Airport (150 km) and Gorakhpur Airport (150 km) are the  nearby domestic airports and  Chaudhary Charan Singh Airport, Lucknow (150 km) and Lal Bahadur Shastri Airport, Varanasi (160 km) are the nearby international airports to reach Bikapur.

By Rail
The Indian railway network connects Faizabad, Ayodhya, Sultanpur, Pratapgarh and Allahabad with Bikapur. Faizabad Junction, Ayodhya Junction, Goshainganj, Bharatkund, Chaure Bazar, Rudauli, Kurebhar, Sultanpur Junction are the nearby railway stations from Bikapur.

By Road
Bikapur is on the NH 330 and therefore has good road connectivity with Faizabad, Ayodhya, Sultanpur, Pratapgarh and Prayagraj using the NH 330. Bikapur is also well connected by road with nearby towns Bhadarsa, Masodha, Sohawal, Tarun Bazaar, Haiderganj, Goshainganj, Mehbubganj, Rudauli, Milkipur and Kumarganj.

References

Cities and towns in Faizabad district